Rize Sports Hall is a multi-sport indoor arena in Rize, [Turkey. Built in 2015, it is owned by the Youth Services and Sports Directorate of Rize Province. The sports hall has a seating capacity of 3,000. It is situated in a sports complex.

The construction of the sport complex began on March 23, 2012 with a	groundbreaking ceremony attended by government ministers. The construction cost of the project was given with  35 million (approx. US$ 19.5 million as of March 2012). The facility was completed on March 12, 2015. It hosted sport wrestling events  and basketball matches. 

The sports hall hosted the 2016 European Women's Handball Championship qualification match of Turkey against Denmark on June 1, 2016.

References

Indoor arenas in Turkey
Basketball venues in Turkey
Handball venues in Turkey
Sports venues in Rize
Sports venues completed in 2015
2015 establishments in Turkey